Thaworn (from ) is a masculine given name. Notable people with the name include:

Thaworn Senniam (born 1947), Thai politician
Thaworn Wiratchant (born 1966), Thai professional golfer

Thai masculine given names